Two athletes competed as part of the Athlete Refugee Team at the 2022 European Athletics Championships in Munich, Germany, from 15–21 August 2022.

Athletes

Results

Athlete Refugee Team entered the following athletes.

References

Nations at the 2022 European Athletics Championships
Refugees